Ansfelden is a town in the Austrian state of Upper Austria. The rivers Traun and Krems run  through the municipality. The town is perhaps best known for being the birthplace of the composer and organist Anton Bruckner.

Ansfelden has two museums, the Anton Bruckner Museum and a museum of musical instruments.

In the town's coat of arms, granted on October 28, 1985, the wavy stripe represents the two rivers, the organ pipes the organist and composer Bruckner, and the cog-wheel the town's paper-mills and other older industries.

Between 1945 and 1964 the DP Camp Haid was located in the district Haid.

Population

Local council (Gemeinderat)
Seats in the council, Elections 2015:
FPÖ 15
SPÖ 15
ÖVP  5
The Greens 2 
Total 37

Sons and daughters of the city

 Anton Bruckner (1824–1896), composer, organist and teacher of music theory and pipe organ performance
 Walter Wimmer (1919–2003), politician (SPÖ) and member of parliament
 Hermann Aichmair (born 1924), university professor, author, painter and sculptor
 Hermann Krist (born 1959), politician (SPÖ) and member of parliament
 Josef Schicklgruber (1967), football player (goalkeeper).

People with relationship to the city

 Bernhard Sallmann (born 1967), German filmmaker; grew up in Ansfelden
 Werner Gruber (born 1970), neurophysicist and author; grew up in Ansfelden

References

Cities and towns in Linz-Land District